Frederico Antonio da Costa Ucalam (born 17 May 1999) is a Swiss professional footballer of Portuguese origin who plays for Sion U21 as a forward.

Club career
On 5 March 2017, Da Costa made his professional debut with Sion in a 2016–17 Swiss Super League match against St. Gallen.

References

External links

 FC Sion official website 

1999 births
Swiss people of Portuguese descent
People from Loures
Living people
Swiss men's footballers
Switzerland youth international footballers
Association football forwards
FC Sion players
Neuchâtel Xamax FCS players
Swiss Super League players
Swiss Challenge League players
Swiss Promotion League players